The Podmaine Monastery is a Serbian Orthodox monastery built in the 15th century by the Crnojević noble family in Podmaine near Budva, Zeta (modern day Montenegro). The monastery has two churches, smaller and older church of Presentation of the Mother of God was built by Crnojević noble family in the 15th century while bigger church (of Dormition of the Mother of God) was built in 1747.

Etymology 

The name Podmaine (Pod-Maine) means "beneath Maine". Maine was a small tribe with territory below Lovćen, between Stanjevići Monastery and Budva. The monastery was the gathering place of the tribe, who traditionally held meetings on the feast day of St. George.

History 
The exact year of establishment of the monastery is unknown. The church of Dormition of the Mother of God was built in the 15th century and reconstructed in 1630 while its larger church (Church of St. Petka) was built in 1747.

Metropolitan Danilo I Petrović-Njegoš died in Podmaine Monastery in 1735. He was buried in the monastery but his remnants were later moved to Cetinje. Dositej Obradović lived several months in the monastery when he visited Boka in 1764.

In 1830 Petar II Petrović-Njegoš, based on the request of the emperor of Russia, sold Podmaine Monastery and Stanjevići Monastery together with their estates to the Austrian Empire.

Njegoš wrote parts of his masterpiece The Mountain Wreath in Podmaine Monastery.

Frescoes 

Frescoes in the Church of St. Petka were painted by Rafail Dimitrijević from Risan in 1747 and Nicholaos Aspioti from Corfu.  The monastery was burned down in 1869. In the 1979 earthquake the monastery was significantly damaged and in 2002 it was completely rebuilt and new frescoes were painted in the smaller church (dedicated to the Dormition of the Mother of God). According to some views one of the frescoes titled Sinful bishops and emperors presents a former Yugoslav leader Tito and heads of the uncanonical Montenegrin Orthodox Church as damned and handed over to devils who herd them down into hell in a modern version of the Last Judgment.

See also
 List of Serbian monasteries
 Stanjevići Monastery
 Morača Monastery
 Piva Monastery
 Savina Monastery
 Cetinje Monastery
 Reževići Monastery
 Dajbabe Monastery
 Burčele Monastery
 Ostrog Monastery

References

Further reading 
 

Serbian Orthodox monasteries in Montenegro
15th-century Serbian Orthodox church buildings
Medieval Montenegro
Medieval Serbian Orthodox monasteries
Budva Municipality
Crnojević noble family